The Anglo-Belgian War Memorial is a monument in Brussels, Belgium, which was commissioned by the British Imperial War Graves Commission and designed by the British sculptor Charles Sargeant Jagger. Unveiled in 1923 by the Prince of Wales, it commemorates the support given by the Belgian People to British prisoners of war during the First World War. It is located on the / near Brussels' Palace of Justice and the Belgian Infantry Memorial.

The monument depicts a British and a Belgian soldier carved from Brainvilliers stone. Around the sides are reliefs showing Belgian peasants assisting wounded British soldiers. Casts of the reliefs are held at the Imperial War Museum in London, and a plaster cast of the Belgian soldier is held in the Royal Museum of the Armed Forces in Brussels 
.

Other memorials
Another Anglo-Belgian War Memorial stands on the Victoria Embankment in London. Completed in 1920, it is the work of the British architect Sir Reginald Blomfield and the Belgian sculptor Victor Rousseau.

See also
 History of Brussels

References

Notes

External links

 Two soldiers for the Anglo-Belgian War Memorial – photo of Jagger at work in his studio
 Model for relief on the Anglo-Belgian War Memoria – photo of Jagger's relief
 Photo of the Monument
 Brits Oorlogsmonument/Monument britannique – the Jagger's Brussels Monument (Dutch language)

Buildings and structures in Brussels
Tourist attractions in Brussels
City of Brussels
Monuments and memorials in Belgium
World War I memorials in Belgium
Sculptures by Charles Sargeant Jagger
1923 sculptures
Belgium–United Kingdom relations